Tre-Castell is a hamlet in the community of Biwmares, Ynys Môn, Wales, which is 130.4 miles (209.9 km) from Cardiff and 207.2 miles (333.4 km) from London.

References

See also 
 List of localities in Wales by population

Villages in Anglesey